Aperileptus is a genus of parasitoid wasps belonging to the family Ichneumonidae.

The genus was first described by Förster in 1869.

The genus has almost cosmopolitan distribution.

Species:
 Aperileptus albipalpus
 Aperileptus impurus

References

Ichneumonidae
Ichneumonidae genera